The less-than sign is a mathematical symbol that denotes an inequality between two values. The widely adopted form of two equal-length strokes connecting in an acute angle at the left, has been found in documents dated as far back as the 1560s. In mathematical writing, the less-than sign is typically placed between two values being compared and signifies that the first number is less than the second number. Examples of typical usage include  < 1 and −2 < 0. 

Since the development of computer programming languages, the less-than sign and the greater-than sign have been repurposed for a range of uses and operations.

Computing
The less-than sign, is an original ASCII character (hex 3C, decimal 60).

The less-than sign may be used for an approximation of the opening angle bracket, . ASCII does not have angle brackets but are standard in Unicode. The latter is expected in formal texts.

Programming
In BASIC, Lisp-family languages, and C-family languages (including Java and C++), comparison operator < means "less than".

In Coldfusion, operator .lt. means "less than".

In Fortran, operator .LT. means "less than"; later versions allow <.

Shell scripts
In Bourne shell (and many other shells), operator -lt means "less than". Less-than sign is used to redirect input from a file. Less-than plus ampersand is used to redirect from a file descriptor.

Double less-than sign
The double less-than sign, may be used for an approximation of the much-less-than sign or of the opening guillemet. ASCII does not encode either of these signs, though they are both included in Unicode.

In Bash, Perl, and Ruby, operator  (where "EOF" is an arbitrary string, but commonly "EOF" denoting "end of file") is used to denote the beginning of a here document.

In C and C++, operator  represents a binary left shift.

In the C++ Standard Library, operator , when applied on an output stream, acts as insertion operator and performs an output operation on the stream.

In Ruby, operator  acts as append operator when used between an array and the value to be appended.

In XPath the  operator returns true if the left operand precedes the right operand in document order; otherwise it returns false.

Triple less-than sign
In PHP, operator  is used to denote the beginning of a heredoc statement (where OUTPUT is an arbitrary named variable.)

In Bash,  is used as a "here string", where  is expanded and supplied to the command on its standard input, similar to a heredoc.

Less-than sign with equals sign
The less-than sign with the equals sign, may be used for an approximation of the less-than-or-equal-to sign, . ASCII does not have a less-than-or-equal-to sign, but Unicode defines it at code point U+2264.

In BASIC, Lisp-family languages, and C-family languages (including Java and C++), operator  means "less than or equal to". In Sinclair BASIC it is encoded as a single-byte code point token.

In Prolog,  means "less than or equal to" (as distinct from the arrow ).

In Fortran, operators  and  both mean "less than or equal to".

In Bourne shell and Windows PowerShell, the operator  means "less than or equal to".

Less-than sign with hyphen-minus
In the R programming language, the less-than sign is used in conjunction with a hyphen-minus to create an arrow, this can be used as the left assignment operator.

Spaceship operator
Less-than sign is used in the spaceship operator.

HTML
In HTML (and SGML and XML), the less-than sign is used at the beginning of tags. The less-than sign may be included with &lt;. The less-than-or-equal-to sign, may be included with &le;.

Mathematics
In an inequality, the less-than sign and greater-than sign always "point" to the smaller number. Put another way, the "jaws" (the wider section of the symbol) always direct to the larger number.

See also
Inequality (mathematics)
Greater-than sign
Relational operator
Much-less-than sign

References

Typographical symbols
Mathematical symbols
Inequalities